Vince Giordano (born March 11, 1952 in Brooklyn) is an American saxophonist and leader of the New York-based Nighthawks Orchestra. He specializes in jazz of the 1920s and 1930s and his primary instrument is the bass saxophone. Vince Giordano and the Nighthawks have played on television and film soundtracks, including the HBO series Boardwalk Empire and Woody Allen's musical comedy film Everyone Says I Love You.

Music career
When he was five, Giordano listened to music of the 1920s on a wind-up Victrola. When he was 15, he played string bass and bass saxophone professionally and took lessons from Bill Challis to learn about writing arrangements like the dance bands of the 1920s and 30s. He performed with New Paul Whiteman Orchestra, the Bix Beiderbecke Memorial Jazz Band, he New York Jazz Repertory Company, and Leon Redbone. He plays bass saxophone, string bass and tuba with his band, The Nighthawks, which plays music from the early days of jazz, such as Jelly Roll Morton, Louis Armstrong, and Duke Ellington.

Lending his musical and acting talents to Francis Ford Coppola's film The Cotton Club led to working with Dick Hyman's Orchestra in half a dozen Woody Allen soundtracks, then acting as bass player, most notably in Sean Penn's band in Allen's Sweet and Lowdown. Giordano and the Nighthawks have appeared on soundtracks for the movies The Aviator, Finding Forrester, The Good Shepherd, and Public Enemies, the HBO mini-series Mildred Pierce, and the HBO series Boardwalk Empire.

Collecting
Giordano is a music historian and collector with more than 60,000 scores in his collection. He is listed as "a friend of Thornton Hagert and the Vernacular Music Research's archive of music" in The Devil's Horn: The Story of the Saxophone by Michael Segall (2006). In 2011, he was featured in the PBS series Michael Feinstein's American Songbook, in which he reveals his treasures from the Great American Songbook. His collection includes big band arrangements, silent movie scores, 78-rpm discs, piano rolls, and a Victrola.

Performing
Giordano and his band have been guests on Garrison Keillor's variety radio show, A Prairie Home Companion. Turner Classic Movie Film Festival spotlighted him at Hollywood's Music Box, where the band performed vintage movie music, in addition to accompanying The Cameraman, a Buster Keaton silent film shown at the Egyptian Theater. In the summer of 2012, the band performed at the Newport Jazz Festival, Music Mountain, and the Litchfield Jazz Festival.  In 2016 a feature-length documentary, "There's a Future in the Past", about Giordano and his band was released.

Awards and honors
 Grammy Award for Best Compilation Soundtrack for Visual Media, Boardwalk Empire Volume 1: Music from the HBO Original Series, 2012

Selected discography
 Quality Shout (Stomp Off, 1993)
 The Goldkette Project (Circle, 1994)
 Music of the Cotton Club Revisited (Nighthawk, 2001)
 Remembering Louis (Jump, 2002)
 Cheek to Cheek  (Nighthawk, 2003)
 Moonlight Serenade – Big Band Hits of the 1930s & '40s (Nighthawk, 2006)
 Top Hat, White Tie & Tails

Soundtrack appearances
 1994 Baseball: The American Epic
 1997 Everyone Says I Love You
 2001 Ghost World (film)
 2004 The Aviator
 2006 George M. Cohan Tonight!
 2007 The Good Shepherd
 2011 Mildred Pierce: Music from the HBO Miniseries 
 2011 Boardwalk Empire Volume 1: Music from the HBO Original Series 
 2013 Boardwalk Empire Volume 2: Music from the HBO Original Series
 2014 Boardwalk Empire Volume 3: Music from the HBO Original Series
 2015 Bessie: Music from the HBO Film
 2016 Cafe Society

With Leon Redbone
 1978 Champagne Charlie 
 1981 From Branch to Branch
 1985 Red to Blue
 1991 Sugar
 1992 Up a Lazy River
 1994 Whistling in the Wind
 2001 Any Time

With Marty Grosz
 1996 The Rhythm for Sale
 2002 Remembering Louis
 2005 Chasin' the Spots
 2006 Marty Grosz and His Hot Combination
 2009 Hot Winds: The Classic Sessions
 2012 The James P. Johnson Songbook

With Back Bay Ramblers
 1994 My Mamma's in Town!
 2001 Cuttin' Up
 2003 Red Hot Band

With others
 1986 Chicago Jazz Summit, Chicago Jazz Summit
 1990 Get Yourself a New Broom (and Sweep Those Blues Away), Guy Van Duser
 1993 Jelly's Last Jam, Silver Leaf Jazz Band
 1994 Jazz Hot Ensemble, Jazz Hot Ensemble
 1994 The Keith Ingham New York 9, Vol. 1, Keith Ingham
 1994 The Keith Ingham New York 9, Vol. 2, Keith Ingham
 1997 Play the Music of Jelly Roll Morton, New Jazz Wizards
 2001 Sweet & Lowdown, Dave Van Ronk
 2001 Deep Night, Barbara Rosene
 2002 Things Are Looking Up, Paul Bacon
 2003 Black Manhattan: Theater and Dance Music of James Rick Benjamin, The Paragon Ragtime Orchestra
 2003 Celebrating Bix!, Bix Beiderbecke Centennial All Stars
 2003 Stormy Weather: The Music of Harold Arlen
 2004 Doin' Things, Andy Stein
 2004 If Bix Played Gershwin, Dick Hyman
 2004 It's De Lovely - The Authentic Cole Porter Collection, Cole Porter
 2006 Guess Who's in Town, Daryl Sherman
 2007 Lower Register: Bobby Gordon Plays Joe Marsala, Bobby Gordon
 2009 If It Wasn't for the Irish and the Jews, Mick Moloney
 2009 Together, Lew Green/Joe Muranyi
 2020 I'd Rather Lead A Band, Loudon Wainwright III

See also
 List of jazz arrangers

References

External links
 Official website
 Interview at NPR
 Review in Show Business Weekly

1952 births
Living people
American people of Italian descent
American jazz saxophonists
American male saxophonists
American jazz bandleaders
American music arrangers
21st-century American saxophonists
21st-century American male musicians
American male jazz musicians